Boris Blagoev (Bulgarian: Борис Благоев; born 23 June 1985 in Plovdiv) is a Bulgarian football player.

References

External links
Profile at Guardian's Stats Centre

1985 births
Living people
Bulgarian footballers
Association football midfielders
Botev Plovdiv players
First Professional Football League (Bulgaria) players